Estadio Once de Noviembre is a baseball park in Cartagena de Indias, Colombia.  According to the famous American architectural historian Henry-Russell Hitchcock in his Book Latin American Architecture Since 1945, this is one of the most striking examples in the world of cantilevered shell vaulting. The team of architects, Ortega, Solano, Burbano and Gaitan Cortes, had the inspired collaboration of an extraordinary designer of structures, the engineer Guillermo Gonzalez Zuleta. A pivotal project of the mid century modernization policy in Colombia that brought on new construction techniques and a novel way of doing architecture, it synthesizes a special moment for architecture and engineering in Colombia. 

El Estadio de Béisbol de Cartagena, diseñado y construido en 1947, sintetizó un momento especial de la arquitectura y la ingeniería en Colombia. Es un proyecto ejemplar de la política de modernización del país, la actualización de técnicas constructivas en obras civiles y arquitectónicas, y de una nueva manera de hacer arquitectura.    

It currently serves as the home of the Tigres de Cartagena. The stadium holds 12,000 people.

References 

Baseball in Colombia
Baseball venues in South America
Sports venues in Colombia
Buildings and structures in Cartagena, Colombia
Sports venues completed in 1947
1947 establishments in Colombia

Hitchcock, Henry Russell, Latin American Architecture since 1945, Museum of Modern Art, New York 1955